Umitaka Bank is a submarine bank in the Balleny Islands area. It was named after the research vessel Umitaku-Maru of the Tokyo University of Fisheries, which took soundings in the area (1964–65). Name approved 4/80 (ACUF 201).

References

Undersea banks of the Southern Ocean